Washington Township, Nebraska may refer to the following places:

Washington Township, Harlan County, Nebraska
Washington Township, Knox County, Nebraska
Washington Township, Franklin County, Nebraska
Washington Township, Hall County, Nebraska

See also

Washington Township (disambiguation)

Nebraska township disambiguation pages